Caras (Portuguese: Faces) is a Portuguese language weekly celebrity and women's magazine published in Lisbon, Portugal. The magazine is also distributed in Brazil and Angola and published in Spanish language in Argentina and Uruguay.

History and profile
Caras was established in Argentina on 24 November 1992 by Editorial Perfil and launched in Portugal in 1995. The magazine was part of the Impresa Group, which also controlled the weekly newspaper Expresso and news magazine Visão. In 2018 Portuguese company Trust in News (TIN) acquired the magazine. The publisher of the magazine, based in Lisbon, was Edimpresa-Editora Lda, a subsidiary of the Swiss publishing company Edipresse.

Caras provides weekly news on the private lives of the public figures both from Portugal and from other countries and news about fashion, beauty, health, cuisine and decoration. The magazine has been distributed weekly in Angola since September 2005.

In 2014 Caras was the recipient of the Meios and Publicidade award in the category of society publication.

From 1988 to 2019 an edition of Caras was published in Chile.

Circulation
In 2007 Caras had a circulation of 91,000 copies. The circulation of the weekly was 88,691 copies from February 2008 to February 2009. Its circulation was 60,979 copies between September and October 2013.

See also
 List of magazines in Argentina

References

External links
 Caras Argentina 
 Caras Brasil 
 Official website 
 Caras Uruguay 

1992 establishments in Argentina
1995 establishments in Portugal
Caras
Caras
Magazines established in 1992
Magazines established in 1995
Caras
Caras
Mass media in Rio de Janeiro (city)
Caras
Caras
Caras
Caras